Gravitational decoherence is a term for hypothetical mechanisms by which gravitation can act on quantum mechanical systems to produce decoherence. Advocates of gravitational decoherence include Frigyes Károlyházy, Roger Penrose and Lajos Diósi. 

A number of experiments have been proposed to test the gravitational decoherence hypothesis.

Dmitriy Podolskiy and Robert Lanza have argued that gravitational decoherence may explain the existence of the arrow of time.

See also 
 Penrose interpretation
 Diósi–Penrose model
 Objective-collapse theory
 Quantum gravity

References 

Quantum mechanics
Quantum gravity